The Prairie Correctional Facility is a vacant, 1,600-bed private prison located in Appleton, Minnesota. 

Prairie was built by the city of Appleton and first opened, empty, in 1992.  In March 1993 the city reached an agreement with the Puerto Rico Department of Corrections and Rehabilitation to fill all 516 beds. The prison had been built by the city and was sitting empty.  Through the years the prison was expanded twice, housed prisoners from Colorado, Idaho, Wisconsin, Hawaii, Washington, and Minnesota, and was a significant local employer.  

Corrections Corporation of America bought the facility in 1997, and closed the prison in 2010
following declining demand for the facility by the State of Minnesota, which had recently constructed four new 416-bed housing units at Minnesota Correctional Facility – Faribault and added 250 new beds to Minnesota Correctional Facility – Moose Lake.

References

Buildings and structures in Swift County, Minnesota
Prisons in Minnesota
Defunct prisons in Minnesota
CoreCivic
Private prisons in the United States
1992 establishments in Minnesota
2010 disestablishments in Minnesota